Bruceiella is a genus of sea snails, marine gastropod mollusks in the family Skeneidae.

Species
Species within the genus Bruceiella include:
 Bruceiella athlia Warén & Bouchet, 2001
 Bruceiella globulus Warén & Bouchet, 1993
 Bruceiella indurata C. Chen & Linse, 2019
 Bruceiella laevigata B. A. Marshall, 1994
 Bruceiella pruinosa B. A. Marshall, 1994
 Bruceiella wareni Okutani, Hashimoto & Sasaki, 2004

References

 Warén A. & Bouchet P. (1993) New records, species, genera, and a new family of gastropods from hydrothermal vents and hydrocarbon seeps. Zoologica Scripta 22: 1-90.

External links
 Museum of New Zealand: Bruceiella

 
Skeneidae
Gastropod genera